Erma Duricko is an American theatre director specializing in new plays and the works of Tennessee Williams. She is the artistic director of Blue Roses Productions, a New York-based production company. She is a recognized interpreter of Tennessee Williams' work having directed most of his major plays and debuting several of his unpublished works.

References
http://blueroses.org/family/erma.html
http://www.circleeast.com/faculty.htm
http://pipl.com/directory/people/Erma/Duricko

Living people
Year of birth missing (living people)
American theatre directors
Women theatre directors